The 2021 Women's Indoor Pan American Cup was the eighth edition of the Women's Indoor Pan American Cup, the quadrennial international women's indoor hockey championship of the Americas organized by the Pan American Hockey Federation. It was held alongside the men's tournament in Spring City, Pennsylvania, United States from June 25 to 27, 2021.

The winners, United States, qualified for the 2022 Women's FIH Indoor Hockey World Cup in Liège, Belgium.

Results

Round-robin

Classification round

Third place game

Final

Statistics

Final standings

Awards
The following awards were given at the conclusion of the tournament.

Goalscorers

See also
2021 Men's Indoor Pan American Cup

References

Women's Indoor Pan American Cup
Indoor Pan American Cup
Indoor Pan American Cup
Sports in the Delaware Valley
International women's field hockey competitions hosted by the United States
Indoor Pan American Cup
Indoor Pan American Cup
Pan American Cup